Johnny's Blues: A Tribute To Johnny Cash is a 2003 compilation album, released by Northern Blues Music, of blues-oriented songs made popular by Johnny Cash, sung by various Canadian and American performers.

Track listing

Personnel
Alvin Youngblood Hart - vocals, guitar
Sleepy LaBeef - vocals, acoustic guitar, electric guitar
Tom Wilson - vocals, acoustic guitar
Colin Linden - vocals, electric guitar, mandolin
Stephen Fearing - vocals, electric guitar
Chris Thomas King - vocals, 12-string guitar
Paul Reddick - vocals, harmonica
Mic Capdevielle - bass voice
Del Rey - guitar
Jim Tullio - acoustic guitar, bass guitar, percussion
Mark Bosch
Alan Freedman - acoustic guitar
Kevin Breit - slide guitar, steel guitar, National guitar, mandocello, mandola, mandolin, bass clarinet
Jim Weider - slide guitar
Jim Vivian - fiddle
Tony Cedras - accordion
Bob Doidge - trumpet
Richard Bell - piano
Joe Krown - organ
Chris Cameron - Wurlitzer organ
David Roe - upright bass
David Hyde
Butch Taylor - bass guitar
David Direnzo - drums, percussion
Kevin Tooley
David Peters
Jerry Cavanaugh
Bryan Owings
Gary Craig - drums
Darrell Rose - djembe, percussion
Emily Braden
Tony Backhouse
David P. Jackson - background vocals

2003 compilation albums
Blues compilation albums
Johnny Cash tribute albums